Patterson Lakes Marina is the largest marina in Victoria, Australia. It is situated 1.25 kilometres away from Port Phillip Bay. Traveling time is 35 minutes from Melbourne, and 50 minutes to Portsea. Patterson Lakes Marina is known as the gateway to bustling waterways and the Peninsula via its access to Patterson River. Patterson Lakes Marina performs such facilities as complete boat repair and fueling operations, entertainment facilities, and restaurants.

History
Lang Lang pioneer Alfred Turner Priestley brought his family to Carrum for a holiday in 1913, and in 1918 he bought  of pastoral land north and west of the Patterson River, operating a dairy farm from its northern side. In 1966 the Priestley family after gaining relevant approval were instrumental in establishing a dry dock marina. The first man made marina in the Southern Hemisphere was formed, and in 1988 the farm along with the marina were sold to make way for the new suburb of Patterson Lakes. Having originally been named Whaler's Cove Marina the marina was later renamed Patterson Lakes Marina. Currently Patterson Lakes Marina is the largest marina in Victoria.

Facilities

Hardstand
Patterson Lakes Marina has hardstand areas which accommodate boats up to 60 feet in length. The hardstand is serviced by a travel lift, with a lifting capacity of 25 tons. The travel lift pulls a vessel out of the water and moves it to a hardstand berth or to one of the factories, for boat maintenance and anti-fouling. The hardstand is situated near the new purpose built factories, which cover all facets of the marine service industry: mechanical services, complete boat maintenance, and other services.

Fuel
Premium Unleaded and Diesel fuel are available from the fuel dock in Patterson Lakes Marina. The dock is located on Inner Harbour Drive (enter through the 3rd floodgate).

Trailer Launching
Dual launching ramp with dock allows launch and retrieval of vessels.  The ramp is frequently used 24 hours a day.

Storage

Wet Berth
One of Patterson Lakes Marina services is secure all-weather wet berths for vessels up to 55 feet. All berths are serviced with water, 240-volt power and fire fighting equipment. Patterson Lakes Marina currently has 300 all-weather wet berths.

Dry Stack Storage
Lakes Marina provides dry stack storage. The dry stack storage building is solid concrete and fitted out with fire fighting and superior lighting equipment. The dry berths are located with repair facilities, parking the marina office. Dry berths are available for boats up to 30 feet in length and the crane can lift boats up to 4.5 tons. Current facilities make it possible to store 270 vessels in the dry-stack storage building.

References

External links
 Patterson Lakes Marina Official Website

Marinas in Australia
Transport buildings and structures in Victoria (Australia)
Buildings and structures in the City of Kingston (Victoria)